Robyn Birch (born 10 January 1994) is a British diver. She has won a silver in synchronized 10 metre platform at the European Diving Championships.

Career
Birch initially competed as a gymnast, and has competed in European and World Gymnastic Championships, but in 2011 she switched to diving.

She partnered with Georgia Ward in the 10m synchro event at the 2015 European Diving Championships held in Rostok, and won a silver. They also won a bronze in 10m synchro at the third FINA Diving Grand Prix event held in Gatineau, Canada that year.

Birch competed in the women's 10 metre platform event at the 2019 World Aquatics Championships held in Gwangju, South Korea. She finished fourth with Noah Williams in the mixed 10m platform synchro event.

References

External links
 
 
 
 Robyn Birch at Swim England

1994 births
Living people
British female divers
Place of birth missing (living people)
Divers at the 2022 Commonwealth Games
Commonwealth Games medallists in diving
Commonwealth Games bronze medallists for England
Medallists at the 2022 Commonwealth Games